Karl Wagner (born 9 May 1907, date of death unknown) was an Austrian bobsledder who competed in the 1950s. Competing in two Winter Olympics, he earned his best finish of fifth in the four-man event at Oslo in 1952.

References
1952 bobsleigh two-man results
1952 bobsleigh four-man results
1956 bobsleigh two-man results
1956 bobsleigh four-man results
Bobsleigh four-man results: 1948-64.
Karl Wagner's profile at Sports Reference.com

1907 births
Year of death missing
Austrian male bobsledders
Bobsledders at the 1952 Winter Olympics
Bobsledders at the 1956 Winter Olympics
Olympic bobsledders of Austria